Highland Hall may refer to:

Highland Hall (Columbus, Georgia), listed on the National Register of Historic Places in Muscogee County, Georgia
Highland Hall (Lexington, Kentucky), listed on the National Register of Historic Places in Fayette County, Kentucky
Highland Hall (Hollidaysburg, Pennsylvania), listed on the National Register of Historic Places in Blair County, Pennsylvania

Architectural disambiguation pages